Sanderson is an electoral division of the Legislative Assembly in Australia's Northern Territory. It was first created in 1974, and derives its name from the name initially given to the area in 1879, before its division into suburbs. Sanderson is an urban electorate, covering 21 km² and taking in the Darwin suburbs of Anula, Marrara, Wulagi and part of Malak. There were 5,449 people enrolled in the electorate as of August 2020.

Sanderson is a bellwether seat that has only tended to change hands at times of major political change in the Territory. It was initially won by the Country Liberal Party's Liz Andrew in 1974, when the CLP won all but two seats in the Assembly (both of which went to independents). However, Andrew was defeated by the Labor Party's June D'Rozario when the ALP swept into the Assembly in 1977, taking several seats. D'Rozario held the seat until 1983, she was swept by the CLP's Daryl Manzie amid the massive CLP landslide of that year. Manzie was a popular incumbent, and held the seat relatively easily until his retirement in 2001.

Sanderson then reverted to the ALP in 2001, when Len Kiely was swept into office amid Labor's sweep of north Darwin. The seat was targeted by the CLP at the 2005 election as one they hoped to win back, but Kiely had little difficulty winning a second term amidst a massive territory-wide swing to the ALP. He was defeated in 2008 by Peter Styles, who became only the second opposition MP in the seat's history.  Styles retained the seat in 2012 amid the CLP victory of that year, despite a small swing to the ALP. In the 2016 election, Styles was heavily defeated by Labor's Kate Worden amid the CLP's collapse in Darwin. Worden picked up a swing of over 13 percent, turning Sanderson into a safe Labor seat at one stroke. Worden consolidated her hold on the seat in 2020, and now sits on a majority of 19.3 percent, the second-safest in the Territory.

Members for Sanderson

Election results

References

External links
Division profile from the Northern Territory Electoral Commission

Sanderson